During the 2001–02 season Bologna Football Club 1909 competed in Serie A and Coppa Italia.

Summary
Bologna Football Club 1909 came as close as ever to reach the UEFA Champions League, when only a couple of mishaps at the end of the season stopped the dream season to come true. The midfield led by the inspired trio of Fabio Pecchia, Matteo Brighi and Lamberto Zauli performed brilliantly all season, but Bologna's economy was not enough to keep those players at the club, and Pecchia signed for newcomers Como, while Zauli went to Serie B club Palermo. That Bologna could not retain players who could get a better pay at smaller but ambitious clubs was a worrying sign in spite of the spectacular season. It also had to sell defender Salvatore Fresi to champions Juventus, and looked set for a tougher season in 2002-03. Fresi's 2001–02 season was included an incredible eight league goals, despite being a centre-half.

Squad

Transfers

Winter

Competitions

Serie A

League table

Results by round

Matches

Coppa Italia

Second round

Eightfinals

Statistics

Players statistics

Topscorers
  Julio Cruz 10
  Salvatore Fresi 8
  Lamberto Zauli 6
  Fabio Pecchia 5
  Giuseppe Signori 3

Sources
  RSSSF - Italy 2001/02

References

Bologna F.C. 1909 seasons
Bologna